Lisa Gutkin is an American violinist, singer and songwriter of The Klezmatics. She played in Sting's The Last Ship, had a cameo appearance in “Sex and the City,” and is a MacDowell Fellow at the MacDowell Colony. Lisa appears on hundreds of recordings including From Here On In, a CD of her original songs produced by John Lissauer, and Play Klezmer Fiddle!, an instructional DVD. She has co-authored songs with Woody Guthrie, Anne Sexton, and Maggie Dubris, and composed for symphony orchestra, dance, and film. She is the Co-Music Director and Co-Composer for the Broadway show "Indecent (play)" which won 2 Tony Awards for Best Direction of a Play and Best Lighting Design of a Play in 2017.

Career
Gutkin specializes in bluegrass, Klezmer, and Irish folk genres. She holds a Bachelor of Music in classical violin from the Aaron Copland School of Music at Queens College.

In 2002, Gutkin joined The Klezmatics with the release Rise Up! Shteyt Oyf! and remains a performing and composing member, notably having written the music for the acclaimed track off Wonder Wheel, "Gonna Get Through This World". This album would win The Klezmatics a Grammy Award for Best Contemporary World Music Album in 2007. Gonna Get Through This World was also notably performed with Arlo Guthrie at Carnegie Hall during Thanksgiving of 2004 at “The Annual Holiday Concert: Arlo Guthrie with Special Guest the Klezmatics and Abe Guthrie, Sarah Lee Guthrie and Johnny Irion.”.

Gutkin has performed and/or recorded with John Cale, Rod MacDonald, Jane Siberry and the Irish artists Tommy Sands and Cathie Ryan.

Gukin also composed for the 2017 short film, Summer, written and directed by Pearl Gluck, and is the composer for Gluck's 2019 film, Write Me, written by Pearl Gluck and Deborah Kahan Kolb.

In 2019, Gutkin produced and recorded on Indecent (Original Broadway Cast Recording). Released by Yellow Sound Label on January 28, 2019, the album featured the return of the original Broadway cast for a full recording of all the compositions of Indecent and was produced by Gutkin herself, Michael Croiter, and Aaron Halva.

Partial discography

The Klezmatics (Albums which feature Lisa Gutkin)

Indecent Original Broadway Cast

Lisa Gutkin

Whirligig

Rod MacDonald (Albums which feature Lisa Gutkin)

Richard Meyer (Albums which feature Lisa Gutkin)

Filmography

References

External links
Klezmatics
All Music Profile

Indecent on Broadway

Year of birth missing (living people)
Living people
American violinists
Place of birth missing (living people)
Queens College, City University of New York alumni
21st-century violinists
The Klezmatics members